Galina Mikhailovna Antyufeyeva (Cyrillic: Галина Михáйловна Антюфéева) is a Transnistrian politician and the wife of the breakaway state former Minister for National Security, Vladimir Antyufeyev.

She was born on 6 January 1960 in Belogorsk, Amur Oblast, in Russia. In 1989 she graduated from Chișinău agricultural institute as "scientist-agronomist", followed by a juridical degree from the T. G. Shevchenko State University in Tiraspol in 1998. 

Since 2000 she is a member of the Transnistrian parliament. As MP Antyufeyeva is head of the PMR parliamentary committee on legislation. She has been a member of the Respublika party allied with the PMR's president, Igor Smirnov. On 3 July 2007 she took part in founding the party Fair Republic.

See also 
 PMR parliament

References

1960 births
Living people
People from Belogorsk, Amur Oblast
Fair Republic politicians